Arek Hersh,  (born 13 September 1928) is a survivor of the Holocaust.

Early life and World War II 
Arek Hersh (Herszlikowicz - הרשליקוביץ׳) was born in Sieradz, Poland on 13 September 1928. He was the son of a bootmaker for the Polish army and a homemaker. At the age of eleven, following Nazi Germany's invasion of Poland, he was taken to his first concentration camp. The camp started out with 2,500 men; eighteen months later only eleven were alive. Hersh was moved around several camps before being taken to Auschwitz. Even as a young boy at the time, Hersh deduced that those who were placed in a group with sick, young or old people were considered by the Nazis to be of no use and would be killed. Consequently, while Jews were standing in queues of fitter and weaker people before entering the camp, Hersh crossed to the fitter queue during a commotion near the rear of the line (SS officers tried to take a child from its mother), and in doing so, saved his own life. As the war approached its conclusion and Germany was surrounded by the Allies, Hersh and the other Jews at Auschwitz were transported across the country. He was eventually liberated at Theresienstadt (Terezin, Czechoslovakia) on 8 May 1945 by the Soviet Army. There were 5,000 Jews in his town but only 40 of them came out alive.

The night before he was liberated, Hersh and a few other survivors found an unguarded German warehouse, from which they took as much food as they wanted; they ate so much that their stomachs hurt due to the sudden intake of rich fatty foods which they had lacked for so long. For Hersh, it was his first taste of chocolate in five years. The Soviet soldiers let all of the surviving Jews do whatever they wanted with the Germans; Arek took the captain's food to show him how it felt to starve.

Hersh was included in a group of 300 Holocaust-surviving children who, following their liberation, were brought to the Lake District in England as part of a rehabilitation plan. Their journey is documented in the BBC film The Windermere Children. They were given just seven hours of English lessons and had to learn the rest for themselves.

Hersh lost 81 members of his immediate family in the Holocaust. Only one of his sisters survived.

Post World War II 
In 1948, Hersh volunteered to fight in the Israeli Defence Forces "to contribute towards the war of independence".

Personal life 
Hersh met his wife Jean at a dance in Leeds at the age of 32. They have three children and several grandchildren. He currently lives near Leeds, England. In 1995, as part of his first public discussion of his Holocaust experiences, Hersh published his book, A Detail of History. All the proceeds go to the Beth Shalom Holocaust Centre, where he often gives presentations about his experience.

Awards and honors 

Hersh was the subject of the award-winning documentary "Arek" (2005) produced by UNISON and directed by Tony Lloyd.

In 2009, he was awarded an MBE for voluntary service to Holocaust education.

In 2017 he was immortalised in a sculpture by Frances Segelman for the Leeds Makor Jewish Culture Office.

In 2019 Arek was one of the subjects in the BBC drama "The Windermere Children" telling the story of the child survivors of the Nazi Holocaust that has devastated Europe's Jewish population on arrival to Calgarth Estate by Lake Windermere in 1945.

See also
Miklos Kanitz

References

Hersh, Arek (2001): A Detail of History. Quill Press.

External links
 Imperial War Museum Interview
 Interview for BBC History KS3 / GCSE

Living people
People from Sieradz
Auschwitz concentration camp survivors
Theresienstadt Ghetto survivors
20th-century Polish Jews
Members of the Order of the British Empire
Polish emigrants to the United Kingdom
1928 births